Martyn Elwyn Williams,  (born 1 September 1975) is a former Wales and British & Irish Lions international rugby union player. A flanker, he was Wales' most-capped forward with 100 caps until surpassed by Gethin Jenkins on 30 November 2013. He remains Wales most capped back row forward.

Club career
Williams played club rugby for Pontypridd, with whom he won the 1996–97 Welsh league, then moved to Cardiff RFC in 1999. He captained Cardiff from 2002 until 2005, when Rhys Williams took over the role.

In the Heineken Cup semi-final match against Leicester Tigers on 3 May 2009, Williams missed a crucial kick in the penalty shootout after the game had finished level after extra time, allowing Jordan Crane to step up and score the winning kick. It was the first time that a professional rugby union match had been decided by a shootout.

In March 2012, Williams announced that he would retire at the end of the 2011–12 season.

International career

Wales
After gaining international caps at every junior level he won his first Wales A cap in 1996 and then made the senior side against the Barbarians the same year. His first appearance in the Five Nations Championship was against England in 1998. He captained Wales for the first time against Scotland at Murrayfield in 2003.

He won his 50th Welsh cap against England in the first match of the 2005 Six Nations Championship and played a prominent part in Wales' Grand Slam that year, notably scoring two tries early in the second half against France in Paris when Wales had appeared to be heading for defeat. He was named RBS Six Nations player of the Championship (2005).

Williams announced his retirement from international rugby on 1 October 2007, following Wales' early exit from the 2007 Rugby World Cup only to make a surprise decision to return to international action when he was recalled by new Wales head coach Warren Gatland in January 2008. He was a key member of Wales Grand Slam winning side of 2008, and was considered by many to be one of the best players in the tournament.

Williams currently holds the Welsh record for most appearances in the Five and Six Nations championships, surpassing Gareth Edwards' record of 45 appearances in the third round of the 2009 Six Nations. He attained his 100th cap against the Barbarians on 2 June 2012.

British & Irish Lions
Williams was selected for the British & Irish Lions tours to Australia in 2001 and to New Zealand in 2005. He was also named as part of Ian McGeechan's 37-man British & Irish Lions squad to tour South Africa in the summer of 2009.He is now the Welsh Rugby Team Manager

International tries

Personal life
He played centre-back for the Welsh YMCA U16 football side.

Williams was appointed Member of the Order of the British Empire (MBE) in the 2012 New Year Honours for services to rugby. In July 2012, Williams was made an honorary fellow of Cardiff University.

Publications
He re-released his autobiography Magnificent Seven in August 2008 after coming out of international retirement.

References

External links

Pontypridd profile

1975 births
Living people
Rugby union players from Pontypridd
Rugby union flankers
Welsh rugby union players
Wales international rugby union players
Pontypridd RFC players
Cardiff RFC players
British & Irish Lions rugby union players from Wales
Cardiff Rugby players
Wales rugby union captains
Members of the Order of the British Empire